Poznań Starołęka railway station is a railway station serving Starołęka in the city of Poznań, in the Greater Poland Voivodeship, Poland. The station is located on the Kluczbork–Poznań railway and Swarzędz-Poznań Starołęka railway. The train services are operated by Przewozy Regionalne.

The station was known as Posen Luisenhain during German control.

History
On 15 September 1943 there two trains collided at the station.

Modernisation
During 2015 and 2016 the platform and tracks around the station were modernised and replaced.

Train services
The station is served by the following service(s):

 InterRegio services (IR) Poznań Główny — Ostrów Wielkopolski — Łódź — Warszawa Główna
 Regional services (PR) Łódź Kaliska — Ostrów Wielkopolski — Poznań Główny

Bus and Tram services
4 (Polabska - Armii Poznan - Most Teatralny - Male Garbary - Rondo Srodka - Rondo Rataje - Rondo Staroleka - Staroleka)
11 (Piatkowska - Most Teatralny - Dworzec Zachodni - Glogowska - Traugutta - Rondo Staroleka - Staroleka)
12 (Os. Sobieskiego - Most Teatralny - Poznan Glowny - Rondo Rataje - Rondo Staroleka - Staroleka)
13 (Junikowo - INEA Stadion - Rondo Jana Nowaka Jezioranskiego - Baltyk - Marcinkowskiego - Rondo Rataje - Rondo Staroleka - Staroleka)
17 (Rynek Jezycki - Most Teatralny - Male Garbary - Rondo Srodka - Zegrze - Rondo Staroleka - Staroleka)
58 (Staroleka - Gluszyna - Sypniewo)
65 (Rondo Rataje -Zegrze - Staroleka)
89 (Staroleka Circular)
94 (Staroleka Circular)
527 (Staroleka - Wiorek - Kamionki)

References

 This article is based upon a translation of the Polish language version as of July 2016.

External links
 

Starołęka
Railway stations in Greater Poland Voivodeship
Railway stations served by Przewozy Regionalne InterRegio